The 2011 Australian Open was a tennis tournament featuring six different competitions, and part of the 2011 ATP World Tour, the 2011 WTA Tour, ITF Junior Tour and the NEC Tour, as tournaments for professional, junior and wheelchair players were held. The tournament took place at Melbourne Park in Melbourne, Australia from 17 to 30 January, it was the 99th edition of the Australian Open and the first Grand Slam event of 2011. The tournament was played on hard courts and was organised by the International Tennis Federation and Tennis Australia.

Roger Federer was unsuccessful in his title defence, being defeated by Novak Djokovic in the semi-finals, and Serena Williams was unable to defend her title due to a foot injury she suffered shortly after winning Wimbledon last year. Djokovic won the Australian Open for the second time, and Kim Clijsters, the runner-up to Justine Henin-Hardenne in 2004, won her maiden Australian Open. In the men's doubles the Bryan brothers won their fifth Australian Open while Gisela Dulko and Flavia Pennetta won their maiden Grand Slam title in the women's doubles. Daniel Nestor claimed his second mixed doubles Grand Slam alongside Katarina Srebotnik who won her fourth mixed title, her first Australian, leaving her one away from a career Grand Slam, as she has now won three of the Grand Slams, needing just Wimbledon to complete her collection.

In the junior tournaments both the singles and doubles titles in the boys and girls events were won by Jiří Veselý and An-Sophie Mestach. Vesely won the doubles alongside Filip Horanský whilst Mestach won her doubles crown with Demi Schuurs. Vesely and Mestach won their first Grand Slam titles and became the first players to achieve the junior double together in any Grand Slam since Kristian Pless and Virginie Razzano achieved this at the 1999 Australian Open.

Shingo Kunieda and Esther Vergeer both won the singles and doubles in the men's and women's wheelchair tennis events respectively. Kunieda won his fourth consecutive Australian Open, his fifth overall. In the doubles Kunieda was partnered to the title by Maikel Scheffers. Vergeer's singles win was her eighth Australian Open crown, her seventeenth overall, and the fourth time that she has not lost a game during a Grand Slam final. The win in the final was her 404th consecutive match win, she was partnered by Sharon Walraven in the doubles. In the Quad events David Wagner won the singles while Andy Lapthorne and Peter Norfolk took the doubles crown.

Tournament

The 2011 Australian Open was the 99th edition of the Australian Open, held at Melbourne Park, in Melbourne, Victoria. The tournament was an event run by the International Tennis Federation (ITF) and Tennis Australia, that was part of the 2011 ATP World Tour and the 2011 WTA Tour calendars, under the Grand Slam category. The tournament consisted of men's and women's singles and doubles draws as well as a mixed doubles event. There was also singles and doubles events for boys and girls (players under 18), part of the Grade A category of tournaments of the junior tour. There were also events for wheelchair tennis players, they competed in two categories: Paraplegic players where men and women play in separate competitions and a category for Quadriplegics, shortened to Quads and is a mixed event. These competitions are part of the NEC tour, under the Grand Slam category. The tournament was played on Plexicushion Prestige AO hard courts, which were rated a medium-fast pace by the ITF. The tournament took place over twenty-five courts, including three showcourts: the Hisense Arena, the Margaret Court Arena and the Rod Laver Arena (the Hisense and Rod Laver Arenas have roofs which allow play to continue indoors should the roof be needed).

Points and prize money

Point distribution
Below is a series of tables for each of the competitions showing the ranking points on offer for each event.

Seniors points

Junior points

Wheelchair points

Prize money
The 2011 Australian Open offered record prize money to both men and women of a total of A$25 million (US$24 million), up 3.8% on the total prize money from 2010. The winners of the singles titles took home A$2.2 million (US$2.1 million) with the finalists receiving A$1.1 million (US$1 million). To put it into perspective Kim Clijsters and Rafael Nadal both took home US$1.7 million for winning the 2010 US Open. Below is the list of prize money given to each player in the main draw of the professional competitions; all prize money is in Australian dollars (A$); doubles prize money is distributed per pair.

Men's and women's singles
 Winners: $2,200,000
 Runners-up: $1,100,000
 Semi-finalists: $420,000
 Quarter-finalists: $210,000
 Fourth round: $93,000
 Third round: $54,500
 Second round: $32,000
 First round: $20,000

Men's and women's doubles
 Winners: $454,500
 Runners-up: $227,250
 Semi-finalists: $113,000
 Quarter-finalists: $56,000
 Third round: $31,500
 Second round: $17,200
 First round: $9,600

Mixed doubles
 Winners: $135,500
 Runners-up: $67,500
 Semi-finalists: $33,900
 Quarter-finalists: $15,500
 Second round: $7,800
 First round: $3,800

Fundraising for the Queensland floods

Following widespread flooding in Queensland, several players decided to raise money for the cause. The Association of Tennis Professionals and the Women's Tennis Association donated ten dollars for every ace served during the Australian Open as well as during the two pre-tournament joint events in Brisbane and Sydney. In total, the ATP and WTA raised $51,070.

In Brisbane, Andy Roddick and Sam Stosur pledged a hundred dollars for every ace they hit, which was also matched by Australian player Matthew Ebden when he played in Sydney the following week. Roddick later doubled his pledge to two hundred dollars. In total, Roddick hit fifty four aces, raising just under eleven thousand dollars for his efforts during the Brisbane tournament. In addition to this, the Brisbane International donated another five thousand dollars.

American player Bethanie Mattek-Sands pledged to donate five percent of her prize money from the Hobart International and Australian Open to the cause. The ITF donated $25,000 towards the rebuilding of tennis facilities.

Rally for Relief
On 16 January, Roger Federer, Rafael Nadal, Kim Clijsters, Novak Djokovic, Lleyton Hewitt, Andy Murray, Andy Roddick, Justine Henin, Ana Ivanovic, Victoria Azarenka, Vera Zvonareva, Caroline Wozniacki and Queenslanders Sam Stosur and Pat Rafter played a charity match at Rod Laver Arena to raise money for the flood efforts. Tickets to the event cost twenty dollars, and other events – such as an auction of shirts signed by the players – also took place. Queensland Energy Resources pledged to match the total amount of money raised. The event raised $1.8 million.

Singles players
Men's singles

Women's singles

Events

Seniors
There were five competitions open to professional tennis players. The Association of Tennis Professionals and Women's Tennis Association awarded ranking points in all events apart from the mixed doubles. The singles draws were contested by one hundred and twenty eight players, while sixty four teams partook in the doubles events, and thirty two teams lined up in the mixed doubles competition.

Men's singles

At the start of the 2011 Australian Open, World Number one Rafael Nadal was on the edge of history, as he had an opportunity to become the first man since Rod Laver in 1969 to hold all four Grand Slams at the same time, after winning the previous three. This would not be the Grand Slam, but the media had dubbed the feat if Nadal was to achieve it the "Rafa Slam", which was taken from the "Serena Slam" which was coined when Serena Williams won all four Grand Slam titles in a row spanning two calendar years, which in turn was taken from the "Tiger Slam" in which golfer Tiger Woods accomplished a similar feat in golf.

Nadal was the number one seed and led the field. The other top ten seeds were; defending Australian Open champion and sixteen time Grand Slam champion Roger Federer, 2008 Australian Open winner Novak Djokovic, two time Grand Slam finalists Robin Söderling and Andy Murray, Wimbledon runner up Tomáš Berdych, David Ferrer, 2003 US Open champion Andy Roddick, Fernando Verdasco and Mikhail Youzhny.

The start of the 2011 Australian Open saw all the seeds apart from Gulbis, Querrey, who lost in the fifth set 8–6 and Davydenko make it to the second round. Montanes, Fish, Monfils, Baghdatis, Tsonga, Bellucci and Nalbandian all survived final set deciders. The second round witnessed all the seeds go through except Michaël Llodra who lost to qualifier Milos Raonic, Feliciano López who went out to Wildcard Bernard Tomic, Juan Mónaco lost to Robin Haase. Fish lost to Robredo and Albert Montañés lost to Malisse. While Nalbandian had to retire against Berenkis and Bellucci lost 8–6 in the final set to Hernych. Youzhny, Verdasco, Almagro and Federer all survived final set deciders to progress to the third round. Raonic continued his form from the previous round as he upset Youzhny this time in four sets, the biggest upset to date. While Alexandr Dolgopolov upset Tsonga coming back two sets to one down to win. The third round is also where the seeds meet for the first time, so Garcia–Lopez, Baghdatis, Gasquet, Ljubicic and Troicki all exited to higher seeds. While Stanislas Wawrinka who was the nineteenth seed managed to defeat Gaël Monfils the twelfth seed in straight sets. Marin Čilić, semifinalist from 2010 defeated John Isner 9–7 in the final set. The fourth round saw Ferrer end Raonic's run, and Dolgopolov edge out Soderling in the final set for the biggest upset in the tournament to date. There were also wins for Berdych, Djokovic, Federer, Murray and Nadal, all except Federer eliminated other seeds. There was one other upset as nineteenth seed Wawrinka beat Roddick in straight sets.

Djokovic, Federer and Murray successfully made their way into the semifinals, however the upset of the tournament happened as Nadal went out. The "Rafa Slam" attempt came to an end on Australia Day in straight sets against Ferrer, a year to the day since Nadal last lost a Grand Slam match. The semifinals witnessed Djokovic taking out Federer in straight sets while Murray overcame Ferrer the next night in four sets. In the final Djokovic defeated Murray for his second Australian Open crown in straight sets.

Championship match result

 Novak Djokovic defeated  Andy Murray, 6–4, 6–2, 6–3.

Women's singles

The 2011 women's draw was missing its defending champion Serena Williams who pulled out in late 2010 due to ligament damage. World number one Caroline Wozniacki of Denmark was the number one seed. The Dane headed up the top ten seeds which included Vera Zvonareva, three time US Open champion Kim Clijsters, seven time Grand Slam champion Venus Williams, Samantha Stosur, reigning French Open Champion Francesca Schiavone, Jelena Janković, Victoria Azarenka, Li Na and Shahar Pe'er. Former Grand Slam champions, Justine Henin, Ana Ivanovic, Svetlana Kuznetsova and Maria Sharapova were also seeded.

The start of the 2011 Australian Open saw all the seeds apart from Rezaï, Hantuchová, Dulgheru. The biggest upset of the first round was Ivanovic losing 10–8 in the final set to Ekaterina Makarova while Schiavone survived after being a set down to win the final set. The biggest loser in the second round was Janković as she lost to Peng in straight sets. The Serb was not the only seed to exit though as Iveta Benešová defeated Maria Kirilenko, Martinez–Sanchez lost to Cornet. Kleybanova, Kanepi, Pironkova, Bartoli and Wickmayer all joined them on the plane home. Meanwhile, Schiavone had to survive another final set decider this time winning it 9–7. The third round saw Kutznetsova defeat Henin, in what turned out to be the Belgium's last ever match as she announced her retirement in the second week of the tournament. Andrea Petkovic had a virtual bye into round four as Williams retired after just seven points of their match. Makarova caused another upset as she knocked out Nadia Petrova, while Benešová defeated Anastasia Pavlyuchenkova in the final set. Other seeds who went out to other seeded players were Cibulková and Peer who lost in three sets. While Petra Kvitová ended home hopes as she disposed of Stosur, Sharapova had to come from a set down to progress to the next round.

The fourth round witnessed women's tennis history, as the match between Kuznetsova and Schiavone broke records. The match became the longest match, in terms of time for women in a Grand Slam as it lasted for 4 hours, and 44 minutes. At 8–7 in the final set Kutznetsova had three match points, but the Italian saved all three. In the next game Schiavone broke her opponents serve but touched the net after hitting the winner, meaning the point went to Kutznetsova, when holding three break points. Kutznetsova had another three match points in the next game before a run of four games in a row where the serve was broken. Finally after breaking in the previous game and missing three match points Schiavone closed the match out to win 16–14 in the final set. Other fourth round matches saw Sevastova's run end against Wozniacki and Makarova's end against Clijsters, while Petkovic upset Sharapova in straight sets. Other upsets saw Na Li and Kvitová defeat higher seeded players.

In the quarterfinals Wozniacki put an end to Schiavone's run by winning a final set decider. Also going into the semifinals were Li who defeated Petkovic, Clijsters who defeated Radwańska and Zvonareva who took care of Kvitová. In the first semifinal Li caused an upset, as she saved match point, to defeat the world number one Wozniacki in three sets. As a result, Li became the first Chinese citizen to reach a Grand Slam singles final. Her opponent in the final, Clijsters, won in straight sets against Zvonareva. In the final Clijsters came from a set down to claim her first Australian Open title. It was her fourth grand slam title in her career and second consecutive slam having won the US Open in 2010.

Championship match result

 Kim Clijsters defeated  Li Na, 3–6, 6–3, 6–3.

Men's doubles

The 2011 men's doubles competition saw the two-time defending champions and four-time champions overall come back to defend the two previous titles in the team of Bob and Mike Bryan, which they were the number one seeded team in the draw. All of the top eight seeds made the quarterfinals, with the exception being the seventh seeded team of Lukáš Dlouhý and Paul Hanley who exited in round one. Lastly, this event saw four teams exit in the quarterfinal round, which those was the 4th seeded team of Łukasz Kubot and Oliver Marach, Mariusz Fyrstenberg and Marcin Matkowski the 5 seeded team, the 6th seeded and 2010 Wimbledon Champions Jürgen Melzer and Philipp Petzschner, and the 8th seeded team of Michaël Llodra and Nenad Zimonjić.

In the semifinals Bhupathi and Peas beat Max Mirnyi and Daniel Nestor in the final set.  This set up a final against the Bryan Brothers who won in straight sets over Butorac and Rojer. In the championship match the Bryan Brothers won in straight sets for their third title in a row. This was also the Bryan Brothers tenth Men's Doubles Grand Slam title leaving them one behind the Woodies (Todd Woodbridge and Mark Woodforde) all time grand slam record of 11 titles.

Championship match result

 Bob Bryan /  Mike Bryan defeated  Mahesh Bhupathi /  Leander Paes, 6–3, 6–4.

Women's doubles

The 2011 women's doubles competition was wide open with no team in the field having previously won a grand slam. Argentina's Gisela Dulko and Flavia Pennetta of Italy led the field as the number one seeds, who had won seven titles in 2010 including the WTA championships but they had never been past a Grand Slam semifinal. Second seeds were the French Open finalists Květa Peschke and Katarina Srebotnik, who had already won a tournament in 2011, the ASB Classic. Number three seeds are the US Open finalists Liezel Huber and Nadia Petrova; the number four seeds are the 2009 WTA Champions Nuria Llagostera Vives and María José Martínez Sánchez with Cara Black and Anastasia Rodionova seeded fifth heading the field.

All the seeds made it through the opening round with the exception of Francesca Schiavone and Rennae Stubbs, who lost, winning just five games in what was Stubbs' final Australian Open. In round two the biggest casualties were the departure of the number four seeds; Llagostera Vives and Martínez Sánchez in straight sets. In the third round the number six, seven and eighth seeds all crashed out. In the quarterfinals Huber won the battle of the ex-partners as she downed Black's team to set up a semi final with Dulko and Penetta. The other semi was filled by Azarenka and Kirilenko and the number two seeds. In the semis the Number one seeds advanced to the final where after a shock they faced Azerenka and Kilrenko. In the final Dulko and Pennetta came from a set down to win.

Championship match result

 Gisela Dulko /  Flavia Pennetta defeated  Victoria Azarenka /  Maria Kirilenko, 2–6, 7–5, 6–1.

Mixed doubles

The mixed doubles field was led by top seeds and US Open champions Bob Bryan and Liezel Huber. Other significant seeds were: number two seeds Daniel Nestor and Katarina Srebotnik, Nestor's ex-doubles partner Nenad Zimonjić and Maria Kirilenko are the third seeds. Fourth seeds were defending champions Leander Paes and Cara Black, while the fifth and sixth seeds were Aisam-ul-Haq Qureshi and Květa Peschke and Wesley Moodie and Lisa Raymond.

All the seeded teams made it through the first round apart from the teams of Aisam-ul-Haq Qureshi and Květa Peschke who lost to Rennae Stubbs and Chris Guccione and Moody and Reymond who lost to Horia Tecău and Bethanie Mattek-Sands. The second round witnessed the number one seeds Bryan and Huber withdraw and the defending champions, Paes and Black go out to Paul Hanley and Chan Yung-jan after two tiebreak sets. The quarterfinals saw no upsets as Nestor and Srebotnik, Zimonjic and Kirlienko, Hanley and Chan and Tecau and Mettek–Sands made the semifinals.  In the semifinals Nestor and Srebotnik won in straight sets against Zimonjic and Kirilenko. Their opponents in the final were Hanley and Chan after they won a match tiebreak 11–9 against Tecau and Mettek–Sands. The final came down to a match tiebreak which the number two seeds, Nestor and Srebotnik won. It was Nestor's second Australian Open mixed title while for Srebotnik it was her first.

Championship match result

 Katarina Srebotnik /  Daniel Nestor defeated  Chan Yung-jan /  Paul Hanley, 6–3, 3–6, [10–7].

Juniors
Sixty four players competed in the boys and girls singles events, with thirty two teams competing in the boys and girls doubles events.  The event is one of nine ITF Grade A junior competitions. Qualifying for the main draw took place between 20 and 21 January 2011. Sixty four players attempted to qualify for the main draw of the boys and girls singles. There were eight qualifying spots available to join the forty six direct acceptance, two special exemptions and eight wildcards in the main draw. The qualifying event was held at the Pakenham Regional Tennis Centre. The main draws took place between 23 and 29 January 2011.

Boys' singles

World number one Jiří Veselý led the field. Other top seeds included World number two Dominic Thiem, Orange Bowl Champion George Morgan and World number five Mate Pavić. In the first round of the tournament Pavić exited in straight sets to Karim Hossam. While fellow seeds Dimitri Bretting, Joris De Loore and Ben Wagland also went out of the tournament. Also in action was Vesley and the 2010 finalist Sean Berman who both won their opening matches. Luke Saville caused the biggest upset in the second round as he ousted World number two Thiem in straight sets while Veselý and Morgan progressed with straight sets wins. The third round saw Morgan and Saville win epics in the final set. The quarterfinals saw Veselý, Morgan, Carballés and Saville reach the semifinals, where Veselý and Saville reached the final. In the final Veselý claimed his first junior Grand Slam title as he lost just three games against home hope Saville.

Championship match result

 Jiří Veselý defeated  Luke Saville, 6–0, 6–3.

Girls' singles

The 2011 Australian Open girls field was led by the World number one, US Open and youth Olympic champion, Daria Gavrilova. Joining the Russian leading the field was An-Sophie Mestach, Irina Khromacheva and Monica Puig. While Orange Bowl champion Lauren Davis who competed in the main draw of the women's singles was the third seed and she was also joined by Caroline Garcia who also appeared in the women's draw. The first round saw all of the seeds bar Natalija Kostic move into the second round. Gavrilova, however was not in the second round as she was dumped out in straight sets by fifteen-year-old Kanami Tsuji Puig, in the second round got rid of the last of the home contingent losing just two games in the process. Eugenie Bouchard caused the biggest upset of round three when she lost just three games against Davis. Garcia caused an upset in the quarterfinals as she upset the number four seed Khromacheva in straight sets. The semifinals witnessed Mestach drop her first and only set of the tournament when she defeated Garcia whilst Puig saw off Bouchard in straight sets. In the final Mestach defeated Puig in straight sets to win her first junior Grand Slam title.

Championship match result

 An-Sophie Mestach defeated  Monica Puig, 6–4, 6–2.

Boys' doubles

The first round witnessed Dimitri Bretting and Dennis Novak the fifth seeds and seventh seeds Luis Patiño and Filip Peliwo exit at the first hurdle. All the remaining seeds made it to the quarterfinals, where the number one seeds George Morgan and Mate Pavić who exited to the eighth seeds Mitchell Krueger and Karue Sell in a match tiebreak while second seeds Filip Horanský and Jiří Veselý knocked out sixth seeds Dominic Thiem and Matthias Wunner. Horansky and Vesely reached the final after defeating the fourth seeds Joris de Loore and Mate Delić who received a bye in the previous round in straight sets. While third seeds Ben Wagland and Andrew Whittington took care of Krueger and Sell in a match tiebreak. Horansky and Vesely triumphed in straight sets in the final over Wagland and Whttington.

Championship match result

 Filip Horanský /  Jiří Veselý defeated  Ben Wagland /   Andrew Whittington, 6–4, 6–4.

Girls' doubles

All the seeds made it through the first round without incident. Nastja Kolar and Danka Kovinić the fifth seeds, Tang Haochen and Tian Ran the seventh seeds and the biggest upset with the second seeds Eugenie Bouchard and Monica Puig all went out in the second round. In the quarterfinals An-Sophie Mestach and Demi Schuurs sent the number one seeds Irina Khromacheva and Yulia Putintseva home for the loss of just three games. While Margarita Gasparyan and Daria Gavrilova the fourth seeds lost a match tiebreaker to Eri Hozumi and Miyu Kato whilst Lucia Butkovská and Anna Schmiedlová the eighth seeds won only one game. Kato and Hozumi progressed to the final, where they faced Mestach and Schuurs who knocked out the third seeds Natalija Kostić and Ilona Kremen in a match tiebreaker. In the final Mestach and Schuurs defeated Hozumi and Kato in straight sets for their first Grand Slam doubles title.

Championship match result

 An-Sophie Mestach /  Demi Schuurs defeated  Eri Hozumi /  Miyu Kato, 6–2, 6–3.

Wheelchair tennis
There are six events in the wheelchair tennis discipline; a singles and doubles draw for each of the three categories. The tournament was played between 26 and 29 January 2011. All events were part of the NEC tour under the Grand Slam category. A total of $63,000 was awarded in prize money across all the events.

Wheelchair men's singles

In the opening round World number one Shingo Kunieda defeated Ronald Vink for the loss of just one game. Kunieda would play Robin Ammerlaan in the semifinals after the Dutchman defeated home hope Ben Weekes. In the other half of the draw Stéphane Houdet saw off Maikel Scheffers while Stefan Olsson saw off Houdet's doubles partner Nicolas Peifer. In the semifinals Kunieda and Houdet emerged victorious in the battle for the final. Kunieda defeated Houdet for his twelfth Grand Slam title losing just three games.

Championship match result

 Shingo Kunieda defeated  Stéphane Houdet, 6–0, 6–3.

Wheelchair women's singles

There were eight entries into the singles competition. On her Grand Slam debut Marjolein Buis won in three sets against Annick Sevenans to reach the semifinals. Also into the semifinals were World number one Esther Vergeer who recorded her four hundred and second consecutive match win with a 6–0, 6–0 win over her doubles partner, Sharon Walraven. Buis then took on World number two and home favourite Daniela Di Toro who lost just three games on Australia Day against Aniek van Koot. While Jiske Griffioen would play Vergeer in the semifinals after defeating Grand Slam debutant Jordanne Whiley in straight sets. The semifinals witnessed di Toro and Vergeer make the final with straight sets wins. In the final Vergeer claimed her eighth Australian Open title as she defeated di Toro without losing a game to chalk up her four hundredth and fourth consecutive win.

Championship match result

 Esther Vergeer defeated  Daniela Di Toro, 6–0, 6–0.

Wheelchair quad singles

The tournament was played in a round robin format. Peter Norfolk, the defending champion, opened with a straight sets win over doubles partner Andrew Lapthorne. Whilst World number one David Wagner defeated his doubles partner Nick Taylor for the loss of two games. In the second round of matches Wagner edged Norfolk in a final set decider, whilst Grand Slam debutant Lapthorne recorded his first victory as he won in straight sets against Taylor. The loss for Taylor meant that he was eliminated from the event. In the final round robin matches, Norfolk defeated Taylor for the loss of just three games, while Wagner defeated Lapthorne in straight sets. The win for Norfolk and the loss for Lapthorne meant that Norfolk would play Wagner in the final. In the final Wagner defeated Norfolk for the loss of just five games. It was Wagner's first Australian Open singles title.

Championship match result

 David Wagner defeated  Peter Norfolk, 6–2, 6–3.

Wheelchair men's doubles

There was four teams competing in this event. Shingo Kunieda and Maikel Scheffers beat Wimbledon champions, Robin Ammerlaan and Stefan Olsson in straight sets. They were joined in the final by the all French pairing of Stéphane Houdet and Nicolas Peifer who defeated Ronald Vink and Ben Weekes. In the final Kunieda and Scheffers came from a break down in the first set to defeat the French pair in straight sets.

Championship match result

 Shingo Kunieda /  Maikel Scheffers defeated  Stéphane Houdet /  Nicolas Peifer, 6–3, 6–3.

Wheelchair women's doubles

There were four entries to this competition. Esther Vergeer and Sharon Walraven defeated Daniela Di Toro and Jordanne Whiley in straight sets to make the final. The final was turned into an all Dutch affair as Aniek van Koot and Jiske Griffioen joined them after defeating Marjolein Buis and Annick Sevenans in two tiebreaks. In the final Vergeer and Walraven lost just two games as they defeated van Koot and Griffioen to claim their third consecutive Grand Slam title.

Championship match result

 Esther Vergeer /  Sharon Walraven defeated  Jiske Griffioen /  Aniek van Koot, 6–0, 6–2.

Wheelchair quad doubles

There were just two entries in the quad doubles, and they played a straight final to decide the championship. In the one-off match history was made as Lapthorne and Norfolk became the first all-British pair to win a wheelchair Grand Slam doubles title. It was Lapthorne's first Grand Slam title and Norfolk's first Grand Slam doubles title as the pair defeated the all-American pair of Taylor and Wagner in straight sets for their fourth win over them.

Championship match result

 Andrew Lapthorne /  Peter Norfolk defeated  Nicholas Taylor /  David Wagner, 6–3, 6–3.

Spectatorship

Broadcast
The 2011 Australian Open was broadcast around the world with eleven different broadcasters officially screening the event.  Channel 7 was the host broadcaster, with ESPN covering North America with its International franchise covering South and Latin America.  Eurosport holds the rights to broadcast the tournament in Europe. In Asia broadcasts were covered by ESPN Star Sports and in Japan by Wowow and by CN Sports Interactive Media Group in China.  In Africa coverage is by SuperSport, and in the middle east by Abu Dhabi TV.  Pacific coverage was broadcast by Sky New Zealand in New Zealand and by FIJI TV in Fiji. During the course of the tournament, Tennis Australia and Eurosport, announced that they had extended their partnership for another five years, which extends Eurosports unbroken coverage of the Australian Open to over twenty years.

For the first time in the history of the Australian Open, the qualifying competition for the main draw was streamed live on the internet. Camera's covered courts number three, five, six and seven, as the competition was streamed live on australianopen.com, foxsports.com.au, yahoo7.com, livestream.com and on the Australian Open's Facebook page. The qualifying competition was broadcast between 12 and 15 January. The charity event Rally for Relief was also broadcast live on australianopen.com and Australian network channel seven.

During the first week of the tournament, viewing figures in Australia were down for the second year running. 1.36 million people tuned in for the Men's singles final which was lower than the rating which the women's final received according to figures released by OzTAM.

Attendance
2011 introduced a kids tennis day event, which took place on the Saturday before the tournament took place, the final day of qualifying (But due to play being washed out Sunday was the final day of qualifying). Around eight thousand fans attended the day, as fans entertained themselves in a variety of activities, including watching stringers string racquets and arts and crafts. But the highlight of the day for many fans was a chance to watch past and present players on show court three. These players included, Pat Cash, Henri Leconte, Peter Luczak, Alicia Molik and Anastasia Rodionova.

A full house of 15,000 people watched the charity fund-raiser Rally for Relief on the Rod Laver Arena, while another twelve hundred watched in the grounds bringing the attendance for the day to 16,220.

A total of 651,127 patrons attended the tournament throughout the two weeks, which was lower than the attendance in 2010, although daily records were set on several days. The middle Saturday witnessed a record breaking crowd. As 51,276 filled Melbourne Park, which was a record for the middle Saturday and the biggest crowd ever at the Australian Open for a day session. A further 25,845 attended the evening session which brought the total number of patrons for the day to 77,121 which was again record breaking as it was the largest number of spectators to have attended on one day.

Players

Professional players

Singles seeds
The men's and women's singles draw of the 2011 Australian Open seeded the top thirty-two players who were not injured. The seeds were set on the ranking system's that the Association of Tennis Professionals and the Women's Tennis Association use; so the top thirty-two players seeded were the top thirty-two players according to their rankings.
Men's singles

Withdrawn players

Women's singles

† The player retired from professional tennis and requested to be removed from the WTA rankings at the end of the tournament.

Withdrawn players
The following players would have been seeded, but withdrew before the tournament began.

Main draw wildcard entries
Tennis Australia awarded eight wildcards for the men's and women's professional singles competitions. Former Australian Grand Slam champions, Pat Rafter and Todd Woodbridge helped to select the four discretionary wildcards in the men's draw. In an agreement with the United States Tennis Association, Tennis Australia gave one man and one woman from the United States a wildcard into the Australian Open. Tennis Australia also has a similar agreement with the French Tennis Federation. The Australian Open is promoted as "the Grand Slam of Asia/Pacific"; one male and one female player from this geographical area was awarded a wildcard.  The final wildcard was awarded to the winner of the Australian Open wildcard playoff, a tournament between Australian players, who do not receive direct entry into the draw. Below is a list of players and teams who received wildcard entries into the main draw.

Men's singles wildcard entries
  Carsten Ball
  Somdev Devvarman
  Matthew Ebden
  Ryan Harrison
  Peter Luczak
  Marinko Matosevic
  Benoît Paire
  Bernard Tomic

Women's singles wildcard entries
  Junri Namigata →  Chang Kai-chen
  Lauren Davis
  Jelena Dokic
  Sophie Ferguson
  Virginie Razzano →  Caroline Garcia
  Alicia Molik
  Sally Peers
  Olivia Rogowska

Men's doubles wildcard entries
  Carsten Ball /  Chris Guccione
  James Duckworth /  Benjamin Mitchell
  Colin Ebelthite /  Adam Feeney
  Matthew Ebden  /  Peter Luczak
  Samuel Groth /  Greg Jones
  James Lemke /  Matt Reid
  Marinko Matosevic  /  John Millman

Women's doubles wildcard entries
  Monique Adamczak /  Isabella Holland
  Jelena Dokic  /  Sally Peers
  Daniella Dominikovic  /  Jessica Moore
  Sophie Ferguson  /  Alicia Molik
  Jade Hopper /  Monika Wejnert
  Sophie Letcher /  Viktorija Rajicic
  Tammi Patterson /  Olivia Rogowska

Mixed doubles wildcard entries
  Sophie Ferguson /  Marinko Matosevic
  Jarmila Groth  /  Samuel Groth
  Mirjana Lučić /  Bernard Tomic
  Alicia Molik  /  Peter Luczak
  Sally Peers  /  Carsten Ball
  Olivia Rogowska  /  Matthew Ebden
  Rennae Stubbs  /  Chris Guccione

Protected ranking
The following players were accepted directly into the main draw using a protected ranking: 

Men's Singles
  Juan Martín del Potro
  Dmitry Tursunov

Qualifiers entries
In the men's singles one hundred and twenty eight players, including eight wildcards competed for sixteen entries into the main draw of the 2011 Australian Open. Matches commenced on 12 January and concluded on 15 January 2011, with players required to win three matches to qualify. On the second day of qualifying, the entire schedule was washed out by rain. This was the first time since the Australian Open moved to Melbourne Park from Kooyong in 1988 that play has failed to take place on at least one court. Below is a list of qualifiers for the main draw of the men's and women's singles events.

Men's singles qualifiers entries

  Flavio Cipolla
  Marco Crugnola
  Frank Dancevic
  Grigor Dimitrov
  Denis Gremelmayr
  Jan Hernych
  Blaž Kavčič
  Nicolas Mahut
  Vincent Millot
  Gilles Müller
  Milos Raonic
  Stéphane Robert
  Simon Stadler
  Ryan Sweeting
  Donald Young
  Grega Žemlja

The following players received entry from a lucky loser spot:
  Simon Greul

Women's singles qualifiers entries

  Irina Falconi
  Jamie Hampton
  Anne Keothavong
  Anne Kremer
  Vesna Manasieva
  Petra Martić
  Sania Mirza
  Arina Rodionova
  Arantxa Rus
  Lesia Tsurenko
  CoCo Vandeweghe
  Kathrin Wörle

Withdrawals
The following players were accepted directly into the main tournament, but withdrew with injuries.

Men's singles

Women's singles

Juniors
Below is a list of the sixteen seeds for the boys and girls singles and the eight qualifiers for each event.

Singles seeds

Boys' singles

Girls' singles

Qualifier entries
Qualifying for the junior events took place between 20 and 21 January 2011 at the Pakenham Regional Tennis Centre.

Boys' singles qualifiers entries
  Axel Álvarez Llamas
  Darius Florin Brăguși
  Jaden Grinter
  Thanasi Kokkinakis
  Oriol Roca Batalla
  Bruno Sant'Anna
  Mac Styslinger
  Thomas Szewczyk

Girls' singles qualifiers entries
  Nigina Abduraimova
  Mana Ayukawa
  Teiwa Casey
  Azra Hadzic
  Abbie Myers
  Riko Sawayanagi
  Kanami Tsuji
  Natallia Vavulina

Wheelchair tennis
Below is a list of the seeds for the singles tournaments of the wheelchair tennis event.

Singles seeds

Men's singles

Women's singles

Quad singles

References

External links 

 

 
 

 
2011 ATP World Tour
2011 WTA Tour
2011 in Australian tennis
2011,Australian Open
January 2011 sports events in Australia